Clare Gerald Fenerty (July 25, 1895 – July 1, 1952) was a Republican member of the United States House of Representatives for Pennsylvania.

Biography
Born in Philadelphia, Pennsylvania, all four of Fenerty's grandparents were Irish immigrants. He graduated from St. Joseph's College in Philadelphia in 1916 and from the law department of the University of Pennsylvania at Philadelphia in 1921. During the First World War, Fenerty served in the United States Navy in 1917 and 1918. He reentered the naval service as a lieutenant, senior grade, in 1933. He was a member of the law faculty at the Wharton School, University of Pennsylvania, 1924–1929; member of the Philadelphia Board of Law Examiners 1928–1940; assistant district attorney at Philadelphia, 1928–1935.

Fenerty was elected as a Republican to the 74th Congress. He was an unsuccessful candidate for reelection in 1936. He was appointed judge of Common Pleas Court No. 5 of Philadelphia in November 1939 and was elected for a ten-year term in November 1941. He was reelected in November 1951 and served until his death in Philadelphia.

He died on July 1, 1952 and was interred at Holy Sepulchre Cemetery in Cheltenham Township, Pennsylvania.

References

1895 births
1952 deaths
20th-century American politicians
Burials at Holy Sepulchre Cemetery
United States Navy personnel of World War I
American people of Irish descent
Judges of the Pennsylvania Courts of Common Pleas
Politicians from Philadelphia
Saint Joseph's University alumni
University of Pennsylvania Law School alumni
University of Pennsylvania faculty
Pennsylvania lawyers
United States Navy officers
Republican Party members of the United States House of Representatives from Pennsylvania
20th-century American judges
20th-century American lawyers